Glassy Mountain is a mountain close to Pickens, South Carolina, USA, in Northwestern South Carolina, with a summit elevation of 1703 feet (519 m) above mean sea level.  While it is an isolated monadnock, it is still close to the Blue Ridge, providing views of nearby summits such as Table Rock and Caesar's Head as well as Greenville. The mountain gets its name from a large, bare, granite face on its North side.  At the top of this rock face are small springs that trickle down the mountain, giving it a "glassy" appearance in the sun.  It is easily accessible, as a small service road for transmitter towers leads to the summit.  Local high-schoolers often paint the rock face with graduation years.  These year numbers can be so large as to be seen on aerial imaging of the mountain

This mountain is often confused with another Glassy Mountain located in Greenville County, SC, which is nearby. Glassy Mountain in Greenville County has a higher elevation of 2782 feet and is not a monadnock as it is connected to other mountains. It is also home to the Cliffs at Glassy Mountain golf course community.

References

Mountains of South Carolina
Granite domes
Landforms of Pickens County, South Carolina
Inselbergs of Piedmont (United States)